Guy "Ballobi" Ballo (born December 30, 1988) is a professional Ivorian footballer who plays as a midfielder.

References

External links 
 

1988 births
Living people
Ivorian footballers
Ivorian expatriate footballers
FC Tulsa players
Association football midfielders
Expatriate soccer players in the United States
USL Championship players
Place of birth missing (living people)